The Best of the Capitol Masters: Selections From "The Legend and the Legacy" Box Set is a compilation album by American jazz guitarist Les Paul and Mary Ford that was released in 1992. It is a single CD with tracks from the four-disc box set The Legend and the Legacy.

Track listing
 "Lover" (Lorenz Hart, Richard Rodgers) – 2:49
 "Nola" (Arndt) – 2:36
 "Tennessee Waltz" (King, Stewart) – 3:09
 "Mockin' Bird Hill" (Horton) – 2:18
 "How High the Moon" (Hamilton, Lewis) – 2:08
 "The World Is Waiting for the Sunrise" (Lockhart, Seitz) – 2:12
 "Whispering" (Coburn, Rose, Schoenberger) – 2:01
 "Just One More Chance" (Coslow, Johnston) – 1:55
 "Tiger Rag" (DaCosta, Edwards, LaRocca) – 2:07
 "In the Good Old Summertime" (Evans, Shields) – 2:10
 "Meet Mister Callaghan" (Eric Spear) – 1:51
 "Lady of Spain" (Damerell, Evans, Hargreaves) – 1:53
 "My Baby's Comin' Home" (Feller, Grady, Leavitt) – 2:26
 "Bye Bye Blues" (Bennett, Gray, Hamm, Lown) – 2:03
 "I'm Sitting on Top of the World" (Henderson, Lewis, Young) – 2:17
 "Vaya Con Dios (May God Be with You)" (James, Pepper, Russell) – 2:53
 "I Really Don't Want to Know" (Barnes, Robertson) – 2:52
 "I'm a Fool to Care" (Daffan) – 2:55
 "Whither Thou Goest" (Singer) – 2:09
 "Hummingbird" (Robertson) – 2:38

Personnel
Les Paul – guitar, arranger
Mary Ford – vocals

References

Les Paul albums
1992 greatest hits albums
Mary Ford albums
Capitol Records compilation albums